Dennis Hennig (28 February 195117 January 1993) was an Australian pianist.

Biography
At an early stage of his career he was one of the Australian Ballet's rehearsal class pianists, and later performed live music for ballet performances such as Signatures, An Evening, Seven Deadly Sins and Nearly Beloved.  He also taught at the Sydney Conservatorium of Music.

Ross Edwards dedicated his Piano Concerto (1982) to Hennig, who was soloist at the premiere performance in 1983 with the Queensland Symphony Orchestra under Werner Andreas Albert.  He also recorded the work with the QSO under Myer Fredman. He made numerous other recordings, and at his death he was engaged on a project to record all of Cyril Scott's piano works, but he had completed only 2 CDs. He wrote on the music of Charles-Valentin Alkan.

He played the piano for the music for Jane Campion's first film Two Friends.

Dennis Hennig died of an AIDS-related condition in early 1993, aged 41.  A medal in his memory is presented at the Sydney International Piano Competition.

Recordings
His recordings include:
 Ross Edwards: Piano Concerto (Queensland Symphony Orchestra under Myer Fredman) - world premiere recording
 Franz Liszt arr. Carl Tausig: symphonic poems Tasso, Hamlet, Les préludes, Orpheus – world premiere recordings
 Bohuslav Martinů: Sinfonietta giocosa for piano and orchestra (Australian Chamber Orchestra under Sir Charles Mackerras)
 Cyril Scott: Two Pieces, Op. 47; Lotus Land; Columbine; Two Pierrot Pieces, Op. 35; Pierrette; Poems; Trois Danses tristes, Op. 74; Over the Prairie (Two Impressions); Piano Sonata No. 1, Op. 66  
 Scott: In the Garden of Soul Sympathy
 Richard Wagner arr. Tausig: excerpts from Tristan und Isolde and Die Walküre; Kaisermarsch
 Felix Werder: Banker
 "Pianistic Peccadilloes: selected pieces from the repertoire of Miss Arabella Goddard, Eileen Joyce, Percy Grainger, Teresa Carreño and others":
 Bach: Toccata and Fugue in D minor
 Thalberg: Air anglais varié
 Leschetizky: Andante finale from Lucia di Lammermoor
 Carreño: Little Waltz
 Moszkowski: Concert Waltz in E
 Raff: La fileuse
 Anton Rubinstein: Melody in F, Op. 3, No. 1
 Rubinstein: Trot de cavalerie
 Mozart: Serenade from Don Giovanni
 Grainger: Ramble on the Last love duet in Richard Strauss's opera The Rose Bearer 
 Dett: In the bottoms
 Guion: Alley tunes
 Gershwin: Love walked in
 Gershwin: The man I love
 Grunfeld: Soirée de Vienne.

References

1951 births
1993 deaths
20th-century Australian musicians
20th-century classical musicians
20th-century classical pianists
AIDS-related deaths in Australia
Australian classical pianists
Male classical pianists
20th-century Australian male musicians